is a railway station on the Hakone Tozan Line located in Hakone, Kanagawa Prefecture, Japan. It is 7.1 rail kilometers from the line's terminus at Odawara Station.

History
Tōnosawa Station was opened on October 21, 1920.

Lines
Hakone Tozan Railway
Hakone Tozan Line

Building
Tōnosawa Station has two opposed side platforms. The station abuts a tunnel on both ends, and the platforms can accommodate three-car long trains. Due to lack of space, the switchpoint is located within the tunnel.

Platforms

External links
 Hakone Tozan Railway Official Site

Railway stations in Japan opened in 1920
Railway stations in Kanagawa Prefecture
Buildings and structures in Hakone, Kanagawa